Abak is a town in the Federally Administered Tribal Areas of Pakistan. It is located at 32°34'9N 69°50'28E with an altitude of 1702 metres (5587 feet).

References

Populated places in Khyber Pakhtunkhwa